4183 Cuno, provisional designation , is an eccentric, rare-type asteroid, classified as near-Earth object and potentially hazardous asteroid of the Apollo group, and measures approximately 4 kilometers in diameter.

It was discovered on 5 June 1959, by German astronomer Cuno Hoffmeister at Boyden Observatory in Bloemfontein, South Africa, and later named in the discoverer's honor.

Classification and orbit 

Cuno orbits the Sun at a distance of 0.7–3.2 AU once every 2 years and 9 months (1,019 days). Its orbit has an eccentricity of 0.63 and an inclination of 7° with respect to the ecliptic.

Cuno approaches the Earth to within 40 million kilometers six times in the 21st century.

Due to its eccentric orbit, it is also a Mars and Venus-crosser.

Physical characteristics

Spectral type and composition 

Cuno is a stony S-type asteroid. As it has a reflective surface, composed of a mixture different silicates, nickel and iron, Cuno has been characterized as a rare Q-type asteroid by the 1-meter Jacobus Kapteyn Telescope on La Palma, Pan-STARRS large-scale magnitude survey, and NASA IRTF telescope. On the SMASS taxonomic scheme, Cuno is a Sq-subtype, a transitional group between the S and Q types.

Rotation and shape 

Several rotational lightcurves were obtained by Czech astronomer Petr Pravec and American astronomer Brian Warner between 1998 and 2014. Lightcurve analysis gave a rotation period of 3.56 hours with a high brightness amplitude between 0.47 and 0.83 in magnitude, indicating that the body has a non-spheroidal shape.

In December 2000, Cuno was analysed by radar to determine its shape. The resultant images are lacking in detail, but indicate a rough sphere with some kind of concave depression 1–2 km in diameter.

Diameter and albedo 

Following the space-based surveys carried out by NASA's Spitzer Space Telescope and the NEOWISE mission of the Wide-field Infrared Survey Explorer, Cuno has an albedo between 0.097 and 0.36, and a diameter between 2.945 and 5.618 kilometers.

The Collaborative Asteroid Lightcurve Link assumes a standard albedo for the stony asteroid of 0.20 and calculates a diameter of 3.9 kilometer with an absolute magnitude of 14.4, as the higher the body's albedo (reflectivity), the lower its diameter at a constant absolute magnitude (brightness).

Naming 

This minor planet was named after its discoverer, Cuno Hoffmeister, according to the established practice to name near-Earth asteroids with a four-letter masculine name. The central main-belt asteroid 1726 Hoffmeister, namesake of the Hofmeister family, is also named after the discoverer. The official naming citation was published on 28 May 1991.

Notes

References

External links 
 Asteroid Lightcurve Database (LCDB), query form (info )
 Dictionary of Minor Planet Names, Google books
 Asteroids and comets rotation curves, CdR – Observatoire de Genève, Raoul Behrend
 
 
 

004183
Discoveries by Cuno Hoffmeister
Named minor planets
004183
004183
004183
19590605